Hockey Wives is a Canadian documentary television series which debuted on March 18, 2015, on the W Network. In Québec, the series debuted on September 12, 2015, on the Séries+ (Mariées au hockey). The series follows a group of wives and girlfriends of professional hockey players, as they balance the highs and lows of the hockey world, their personal and social lives.

On May 5, 2015, the network announced that the series had been renewed for a second season. 

On October 13, 2016, W confirmed the renewal for a third season, and on March 20, 2017, the full cast was revealed.  

Season three premiered on April 19, 2017.

Overview
Production for the first season of Hockey Wives was announced on July 17, 2014, in a press release issued by W Network's parent company, Corus Entertainment.

The cast of the third season includes:

 Maripier Morin (wife of Nürnberg Ice Tigers forward Brandon Prust)
 Emilie Blum (wife of Admiral Vladivostok defenseman Jonathon Blum)
 Martine Auclair Vlasic (wife of San Jose Sharks defenseman Marc-Édouard Vlasic)
 Erica Lundmark (wife of Klagenfurt Athletic Sports Club forward Jamie Lundmark)
 Vanessa Vandal (girlfriend of St. Louis Blues forward David Perron)
 Catherine Laflamme (wife of Pittsburgh Penguins defenseman Kris Letang)

Although based in cities all over the world, during the course of the professional hockey season their lives intersect and affect one another's. From wives who are new to the game, to those whose partners are Stanley Cup winning superstars or are nearing retirement, the women form a team of their own to support and encourage each other through personal and professional highs and lows.

Reception
Following the series premiere in March 2015, the show quickly became the most watched series on W Network that year, with record ratings for the broadcaster. In addition, episodes of the series ranked as the top reality series on iTunes Canada after their initial broadcast.

Timeline of Hockey Wives

Episode List

{| class="wikitable plainrowheaders" style="text-align:center;"
|-
! colspan="1" rowspan="1" |Season
! rowspan="1" |Episode
! colspan="1" |Title
! colspan="1" |Originally Aired
|-
! colspan="1" rowspan="8" style="background:#7BB661" |1
| 1
| Married to the Game
| March 18, 2015
|-
| 2
| Home Fire Burnout
| March 25, 2015
|-
| 3
| The Breakout Play
| April 1, 2015
|-
| 4
| Stick handling a Puck
| April 8, 2015
|-
| 5
| Relationship on Ice
| April 15, 2015
|-
| 6
| Love & Loathing in LA
| April 22, 2015
|-
| 7
| Family Skate
| April 29, 2015
|-
| 8
| Pop Ups and Power Plays
| May 6, 2015
|-
! colspan="1" rowspan="16" style="background:#7CB9E8" |2
| 1
| Still In The Game
| October 28, 2015
|-
| 2
| Hockey's Out For The Summer
| November 4, 2015
|-
| 3
| Free Agency Frenzy
| November 11, 2015
|-
| 4
| Let the Good Times Roll
| November 18, 2015
|-
| 5
| The Off-Ice Plays 
| November 25, 2015
|-
| 6
| The Long Goodbye
| March 17, 2016
|-
| 7
| Home Sweet Opener
| March 24, 2016
|-
| 8
| Family Face-off
| March 31, 2016
|-
| 9
| Breakaways
| April 7, 2016
|-
| 10
| New York & New Beginnings
| April 14, 2016
|-
| 11
| Back to Basics
| April 21, 2016
|-
| 12
| Home for the Holidays
| April 28, 2016
|-
| 13
| Time-Out
| May 5, 2016
|-
| 14
| Pucks and Palm Trees
| May 11, 2016
|-
| 15
| Home Is Where the Hockey Is
| May 18, 2016
|-
| 16
| Off-Ice Goals
| May 25, 2016
|-
! colspan="1" rowspan="9" style="background:#FF91AF" |3
| 1
| We Are The Champions
| April 19, 2017
|-
| 2
| On Top Of The World
| April 26, 2017
|-
| 3
| The Puck Stops Here
| May 3, 2017
|-
| 4
| Make or Break
| May 10, 2017
|-
| 5
| From Russia With Love
| May 17, 2017
|-
| 6
| Between the Pipes
| May 24, 2017
|-
| 7
| Home for the Holidays
| May 31, 2017
|-
| 8
| On Thin Ice
| June 7, 2017
|-
| 9
| Down to the Wire
| June 14, 2017
|-
|}

References

External links
 

2010s Canadian documentary television series
Television series by Corus Entertainment
W Network original programming
2015 Canadian television series debuts